Dercylus is a genus of beetles in the family Carabidae, containing the following species:

 Dercylus alternans Kuntzen, 1912 
 Dercylus anthracinus (Dejean, 1831) 
 Dercylus ater Laporte De Castelnau, 1832 
 Dercylus batesi Chaudoir, 1861 
 Dercylus bolivianus Kuntzen, 1912 
 Dercylus buckleyi Chaudoir In Oberthur, 1883 
 Dercylus catenatus Kuntzen, 1912 
 Dercylus chaudoiri Kuntzen, 1912 
 Dercylus convexus Kuntzen, 1912 
 Dercylus cordicollis (Chaudoir, 1883) 
 Dercylus crenatus Schaum, 1860 
 Dercylus gautardi Chaudoir, 1869 
 Dercylus gibbosus Laferte-Senectere, 1851 
 Dercylus heynei Kuntzen, 1912 
 Dercylus infernus Laferte-Senectere, 1851 
 Dercylus italoi Moret, 1999 
 Dercylus licinoides (Perty, 1830) 
 Dercylus mexicanus Bates, 1891 
 Dercylus ohausi Kuntzen, 1912 
 Dercylus opacus Kuntzen, 1912 
 Dercylus orbiculatus Moret & Bousquet, 1995 
 Dercylus praepilatus Moret & Bousquet, 1995 
 Dercylus punctatostriatus Chaudoir, 1869 
 Dercylus puritanus Kuntzen, 1912 
 Dercylus steinbachi Kuntzen, 1912
 Dercylus tenebricosus Moret & Bousquet, 1995 
 Dercylus tuberculatus (Chaudoir, 1883)

References

Licininae